John L. Moore (born August 19, 1954) is an American politician. He was a member of the Mississippi House of Representatives from the 60th District, being first elected in 1995. He is a member of the Republican party.

Moore resigned from the legislature on December 8, 2017, in the wake of multiple allegations of sexual harassment made by multiple women.

References

1954 births
Living people
Republican Party members of the Mississippi House of Representatives
People from Rankin County, Mississippi
21st-century American politicians